The Woman with No Name is a 1950 British drama film directed by Ladislao Vajda and starring Phyllis Calvert, Edward Underdown, Helen Cherry, Richard Burton and James Hayter. In the United States it was released as Her Panelled Door.

Plot
Yvonne Winter is an amnesiac, a victim of the wartime bombing of the London hotel where she is staying. At a country hospital she meets the pilot, Nick Chamerd, who saved her life. They fall in love and plan to marry, but he is killed on active duty. Yvonne's real husband hires detectives to find her. She is brought home and starts to piece together her past, but not everything she finds there brings her happiness.

Cast
 Phyllis Calvert as Yvonne Winter
 Edward Underdown as Lake Winter
 Helen Cherry as Sybil
 Richard Burton as Nick Charmerd
 Anthony Nicholls as Doctor
 James Hayter as Captain Bradshawe
 Betty Ann Davies as Beatrice
 Amy Veness as Sophie
 Andrew Osborn as  Paul Hammond
 Patrick Troughton as Colin
 Leslie Phillips as 1st sapper officer
 Terence Alexander as 2nd sapper officer
 Richard Pearson as Tony

Production
Calvert invested her own savings in the film, estimated between £12,000-£15,000.

References

External links

1950 films
1950 drama films
Films shot at Associated British Studios
1950s English-language films
British drama films
Films directed by Ladislao Vajda
Films about amnesia
British black-and-white films
1950s British films